Gada is one of the 23 Local Government Area in Sokoto State, Nigeria. Its headquarters are in the town of Gada. It has eleven (11) Political wards namely: Gada, Kyadawa-Holai, Ilah-Dukamaje, Gilbadi, Kaffe, Tsitse, Kadadi, Kadassaka, Kaddi, Kiri and Kwarma respectively.

Gada shares a border with the Republic of Niger to the north. It has an area of 1,315 km and a population of 248,267 at the 2006 census.

The postal code of the area is 843.

References

Samalia mainasara moyi gada

Local Government Areas in Sokoto State